Bolsover District Council elections are held every four years. Bolsover District Council is the local authority for the non-metropolitan district of Bolsover in Derbyshire, England. Since the last boundary changes in 2019, 37 councillors have been elected from 17 wards.

Political control
The first election to the council was held in 1973, initially operating as a shadow authority before coming into its powers on 1 April 1974. Since 1973 political control of the council has been held by the following parties:

Leadership
The leaders of the council since 2003 have been:

Council elections
Summary of the council composition after recent council elections, click on the year for full details of each election. Boundary changes took place for the 2003 election.

1973 Bolsover District Council election
1976 Bolsover District Council election
1979 Bolsover District Council election (New ward boundaries)
1983 Bolsover District Council election
1987 Bolsover District Council election (District boundary changes took place but the number of seats remained the same)
1991 Bolsover District Council election

District result maps

By-elections
By-elections occur when seats become vacant between council elections. Below is a summary of recent by-elections; full by-election results can be found by clicking on the by-election name.

References

External links
Bolsover Council

 
Council elections in Derbyshire
District council elections in England